Tuvana-i-Ra is an uninhabited atoll in the southeastern part of the island state of Fiji in the Pacific Ocean. It is the southernmost atoll of the Lau archipelago and represents Fiji's second-southernmost landmass; only the remote and uninhabited atoll Ceva-i-Ra lies slightly further south.

History
The island was sighted in 1820 by the Russian explorer Fabian Gottlieb von Bellingshausen and named "Mikhailov” (after the artist Pavel Mikhailov who was on expedition with him).

Geography
Tuvana-i-Ra is located about 30 km southwest of Ono-i-Lau, Fiji's southernmost inhabited atoll, and 8 km southwest of the neighboring Tuvana-i-Colo. It is an elliptically shaped Atoll with a large island in the center of the lagoon. There are no islands on the fringing reef.

See also

 Desert island
 List of islands

References

Islands of Fiji
Lau Islands